Chutnification is the adoption of Indian elements into the English language or culture.
The word “chutnification” was coined by Salman Rushdie in his novel, Midnight’s Children.  Chutney is a sauce or a dry base for a sauce, originating from the Indian subcontinent.

Rushdie’s Midnight’s Children is not the first novel to exhibit or employ chutnification. More-or-less, all the post-colonial writers tried this in some way or other. 

For example, Chinua Achebe’s seminal trilogy Things Fall Apart, No Longer at Ease, Arrow of God as well as Ngugi wa Thiong’o’s Petals of Blood were written long before Rushdie’s Midnight’s Children. 

But those novels were more busy at ‘creating’ history without proper documentations to challenge the historylessness the Igbo people or Swahili Community was ‘suffering from’ therefore remain in the ‘fictions only’ category.

References

Food preservation